The 1996–97 Slovak Cup was the 28th season of Slovakia's annual knock-out cup competition and the fourth since the independence of Slovakia. It ended on 1 June 1997, with the Final. The winners of the competition earned a place in the qualifying round of the UEFA Cup Winners' Cup. Chemlon Humenné were the defending champions.

First round

|}
Sources: ,

Second round

|}
Sources: ,

Quarter-finals

|}

Semi-finals

|}

Final

References

External links
profutbal.sk 
Results on RSSSF

Slovak Cup seasons
Slovak Cup
Cup